German submarine U-148 was a Type IID U-boat of Nazi Germany's Kriegsmarine during World War II. Her keel was laid down on 10 April 1940 by Deutsche Werke in Kiel as yard number 277. She was launched on 16 November 1940 and commissioned on 28 December with Oberleutnant zur See Hans-Jürgen Radke in command.

U-148 began her service life with the 24th U-boat Flotilla. She was then assigned to the 21st flotilla and subsequently to the 31st flotilla. She spent the war as a training vessel.

She was scuttled on 5 May 1945.

Design
German Type IID submarines were enlarged versions of the original Type IIs. U-148 had a displacement of  when at the surface and  while submerged. She had two shafts and two  propellers.

U-148 was fitted with three  torpedo tubes at the bow, five torpedoes or up to twelve Type A torpedo mines, and a  anti-aircraft gun. The boat had a complement of 25.

Fate

The boat was scuttled in the Raederschleuse (lock) at Wilhelmshaven on 5 May 1945. The wreck was broken up on an unknown date.

References

Bibliography

External links

German Type II submarines
U-boats commissioned in 1940
World War II submarines of Germany
1940 ships
Ships built in Kiel
Operation Regenbogen (U-boat)
Maritime incidents in May 1945